The 1938 Invercargill mayoral election was part of the New Zealand local elections held that same year. The polling was conducted using the standard first-past-the-post electoral method.

Incumbent mayor John Miller sought a fourth consecutive term, the fifth in total, against deputy mayor Gordon Reed. Miller died on 20 September, resulting in a by-election in October.

Background
Miller and Reed had previously run against one another for Invercargill in the 1935 general election, both losing to William Denham.

Results
The following table gives the election results:

References

1938 elections in New Zealand
Mayoral elections in Invercargill